Sant'Angelo Scalo is a village in Tuscany, central Italy, administratively a frazione of the comune of Montalcino, province of Siena. At the time of the 2001 census its population was 185.

Sant'Angelo Scalo is about 60 km from Siena and 15 km from Montalcino.

References 

Frazioni of Montalcino
Railway towns in Italy